Birth of Fire is a science fiction novel by American writer Jerry Pournelle. It was first published by Laser Books in 1976, later published by Baen Books. It is related to the books Exiles to Glory and High Justice, and with those two, form a starting point for the CoDominium series.

Plot
The book starts out in a year sometime between 2000 and 2050. It begins with Garrett Pittson, a respected gang member who hasn't found his path in life, caught in the middle of a gang war and then caught by the police. He is sentenced to prison for twenty years but takes up his lawyer's offer of being shipped out to a colony on Mars where the conditions are rough and the pay unfair.

Once arriving the events stir up and he ends up playing a prominent role in a revolution led by a group of farmers out on the 'rim' of a large crater in Mars southern hemisphere. Garrett is noticed as an excellent student by Commander Farr, who tells him to go to the city, and wait for someone to find him. Someone comes up to him and gets him suited to a P-Suit, he learns to farm and the two travel to a friend's farm where they meet Erica. Garrett has private time with her and they kiss, before she says they should wait, after multiple more trips, the two spend more time together and fall in love.

References

Sources
Pournelle, Jerry.  Birth of Fire.  1976 Baen, Wake Forest.

1976 science fiction novels
Novels by Jerry Pournelle
CoDominium series
1976 American novels
Novels set on Mars